EA-3887 is a carbamate nerve agent. The iodide salt of EA-3887 is EA-3887A.

See also
3152 CT
EA-3966
EA-3990
EA-4056
T-1123
TL-1238

References

Carbamate nerve agents
Pyridines
Quaternary ammonium compounds
Acetylcholinesterase inhibitors
Bromides
Bisquaternary anticholinesterases
Aromatic carbamates